RTVE Play is an over-the-top video on demand streaming service owned and operated by RTVE which replaced the latter's old streaming portal 'alacarta' in June 2021. Besides the programming in the linear stations of TVE and RNE and the content from Playz, the platform distributes a number of exclusive original shows as well it releases pre-screenings of the linear airings.

Programming

New shows

Continuations

See also 
 List of programs broadcast by TVE (RTVE Play archives)

References 

RTVE Play